The Flanders Panel (original Spanish title La tabla de Flandes) is a novel written by Spanish author Arturo Pérez-Reverte in 1990, telling of a mystery hidden in an art masterpiece spanning from the 15th century to the present day.

Plot summary

Julia, an art restorer and evaluator living in Madrid, discovers a painted-over message on a 1471 Flemish masterpiece called La partida de ajedrez (The Chess Game) which reads "Quis Necavit Equitem", written in Latin (English: "Who killed the knight?"). The painting appears as the cover of the book in some editions.

With the help of her old friend and father-figure, an antiques dealer named César, and Muñoz, a quiet local chess master, Julia works to uncover the mystery of a 500-year-old murder. At the same time, Julia faces danger of her own, as several people helping her along her search are also murdered.

Film adaptation
The 1994 British film Uncovered, starring Kate Beckinsale and John Wood, is a cinematic adaptation of the novel.

References

External links
The Flanders Panel at the author's official website.

1990 novels
Spanish novels adapted into films
Novels by Arturo Pérez-Reverte
Novels set in Madrid
Novels about chess
Spanish crime novels
Alfaguara books